Askoldia is a monotypic genus of marine ray-finned fishes belonging to the family Stichaeidae, the pricklebacks and shannies. Its only species is Askoldia variegata which is found in the northwestern Pacific Ocean.

Taxonomy
Askoldia was first proposed as a monospecific genus in 1910 by the Russian ichthyologist Mikhail Nikolaevich Pavlenko when he described its only species A. variegatus, with its type locality given as near Askold Island in Peter the Great Bay in the Sea of Japan, Russia. The genus is placed in the subfamily Opisthocentrinae within the family Stichaeidae by some authorities, while other classify this taxon as a valid family, Opisthocentridae. Some authorities also recognise two subspecies, the nominate A.v. variegata and A.v. knipowitschi but the validity of this subsepcies is not generally accepted. Askoldia is considered to be closely related to Kasatkia.

Etymology
Askoldia is named after its type locality, Askold Island. The specific name variegata means "variegated" and is thought to refer to the colour pattern of a green background colour marked with many poorly defined red spots.

Description
Askoldia has between 57 and 68 spines in the dorsal fin and 2 spines and 38-43 soft rays in the anal fin. The pectoral fins have 20-23 fin rays while the pelvic fins have a single spine and 3 soft rays. It has vomerine teeth and a scaled head. This species attains a maximum standard length pf .

Distribution and habitat

References

Opisthocentrinae
Monotypic ray-finned fish genera